Safiye Erol (2 January 1902 – 7 October 1964) was a Turkish novelist. She is one of the writers of the Republican Era.

Early life
Safiye Erol was born to Sami and Emine İkbal in Uzunköprü town of Edirne, then Ottoman Empire, on 2 January 1902. Her father was a clerk in the Municipality of Uzunköprü, and her mother was a member of the Bektashi Order lodge in Keşan. The family moved to Üsküdar, Istanbul in 1906.

She was schooled in Üsküdar for primary education. Later, she attending the French Missionary School a while. Then, she entered the Deutsche Schule Istanbul for secondary  education.

In 1917, she went to Germany through a scholarship granted by the "German-Turkish Friendship Association". She completed her secondary education at the Private Falkanplatz High School in Lübeck in 1919. Due to some events in Germany, she returned home. In 1921, she went to Germany again, and enrolled in the University of Marburg, but moved to the University of Munich in 1923 to continue her education in philosophy and literature. In 1926, she earning a Ph.D. degree with the thesis Die Pflanzennamen in der altarabischen Poesie , about the plant names in the Arabian language poetry. She returned to Istanbul the next year.

Writing career
She told in her memoires that "one of her professors in Germany said that she would be the Selma Lagerlöf of the Turks in the future" as she likes writing very much.

In the beginning of her writing career, she used the pen names "Sami" for articles and translations, as well as "Dilara" for short stories. She wrote short stories and made translations for the magazines such as Milli Mecmua ("National Magazine") and Her Ay ("Every Month"). Her first novel Kadıköyü'nün Romanı was serialized in the newspaper Vakit in 1935, which was published as a book in 1938. Her next novel  Ülker Fırtınası was published in 1944 after it appeared in as a serial in the daily Cumhuriyet in 1938. Her favorite novel was the 1946-published Ciğerdelen, Turkish for Štúrovo on the River Danube. She translated the 1914-novel Kejsarn av Portugallien  of Swedish Selma Lagerlöf (1858–1940) as Portugaliye İmparatoriçesi (1941) and German Friedrich de la Motte Fouqué's (1777–1843) 1811-novel Undine as Su Kızı (1945). In 1951, her three-part philosophical review of the Sufi thinker Kenan Rıfai was published in Kenan Rıfai ve Yirminci Asrın Işığında Müslümanlık  ("Kenan Riffai and Islam in the Light of the Twentieth Century"). Her last novel Dinyeri Papazı was serialized in the daily Tercüman in 1955. During the Islamic fasting month of Ramadan in 1962, she wrote the serial Çölde Biten Rahmet Ağacı in the newspaper Yeni Istanbul, which narrated the phases of the life of Prophet Muhammad in the desert. Many articles of her published in various newspapers and magazines were collected in a book titled Makaleler  in 2002. Her short stories were published post-mortem in the book Leylak Mevsimi in 2010.

Private life
She married in 1931. She served as city councilor in 1943. In her later years from 1961 on, she was active in cultural events as a member of the "Development and Culture Association of Üsküdar".

Safiye Erol died at the age of 62 in Istanbul on 7 October 1964, and was buried at the Karacaahmet Cemetery.

Works

References

External links
Safiye Erol website 

1902 births
People from Uzunkol District
Deutsche Schule Istanbul alumni
University of Marburg alumni
Ludwig Maximilian University of Munich alumni
20th-century Turkish women writers
20th-century Turkish writers
Turkish women novelists
1964 deaths
Burials at Karacaahmet Cemetery